Joseph Paintsil (born 1 February 1998) is a Ghanaian professional footballer who plays as a midfielder for Belgian club Genk, and the Ghana national team.

Club career

Tema Youth 
Paintsil made his Ghana Premier League debut with Tema Youth 12 February 2017 after the club were promoted from Division One the previous season. He scored 10 goals in 22 games during his only season, before leaving Ghana for Europe during the season's month-long break in August. Paintsil was fifth in the Golden Boot race at the time of his departure, and finished the season joint-eighth, top scorer for Tema.

Ferencvárosi 
On 31 August, Paintsil signed with top Hungarian club Ferencváros, playing in the country's top-flight, the NBI. Initially signed on loan, Paintsil had an option with the club to be signed permanently at the end of the season. Paintsil made his debut on 9 September against Vasas, scoring the first goal in a 5–2 win, taking the place of Rui Pedro in the lineup. He scored four goals in his first five games, and was a mainstay in the lineup of manager Thomas Doll. On 2 December, Paintsil scored a goal on the counter-attack against Videoton that showcased his pace and ball control, and would later be voted as the Goal of the Year for 2017 by Hungarian football fans. At the halfway point of the season, Paintsil had six goals and four assists, and was rated by Nemzeti Sport as the league's top player. Paintsil split his time starting on the left and in the middle, as a #10. He finished the season with 10 goals in 25 games, good for third on the team and ninth in the league. Ferencváros finished the league in second, and after rumours of a winter transfer that was not allowed to go through by the club, Paintsil left the club after the season.

Genk
On 3 July 2018, Paintsil was unveiled as a player of Belgian club Genk, a few weeks after a contract had been agreed with the club. Paintsil began the season with an injury, missing three league games and four Europa League qualifiers. His debut came on 19 August in the First Division A against R. Charleroi S.C., and his full debut came the following week against Waasland-Beveren. His first goals came when he scored a brace against Gent on 7 October. His continental debut came when Paintsil was used off the bench in both legs of the play-off round against Danish side Brøndby. He came off the bench at half-time against Sarpsborg on 4 October, replacing Dieumerci Ndongala. After that, he started the remaining four group stage games, scoring in the last two, as Genk won their group. Genk drew Slavia Prague in the knockout stage, and Paintsil didn't start either leg as Genk were eliminated 1–4 on aggregate. Paintsil also started all three games of Genk's campaign in the Belgian Cup, which ended in the quarterfinals with a penalty shootout defeat in which Paintsil scored to Union SG. His form in the league wasn't as strong, and the goals against Gent were his only goals during the regular season. Paintsil scored in the first match of the play-offs, a 3–0 win over Anderlecht on 30 March 2019. His first start in three months came on the final day of the season, after Genk had already clinched their first title in eight seasons. In the league, Paintsil made 25 appearances, scoring three times.

Paintsil was on the bench for the club's win in the Belgian Super Cup, but didn't enter the game. Following the sale of Leandro Trossard to England in the off-season, Paintsil was given an opportunity to claim the left wing position, and scored his first goal on 17 August against Waasland-Beveren. He had a run of six games in the team to start the season until leaving the game on 13 September against Charleroi in the first half with an injury. Paintsil returned after nearly two months out with injury, starting against Mouscron on 23 November. His Champions League debut came on 2 October against Italian side Napoli, receiving the final minutes off the bench. He played twice more in the group stage, including starting the final game against Napoli, as the club were already eliminated from further continental play, impressing in the 4–0 defeat. Paintsil would only make two starts the rest of the season, which was suspended in March due to the COVID-19 pandemic in Belgium, his spot mostly taken by Théo Bongonda.

Personal life
Born and raised in Fadama, a suburb of Accra, Paintsil models his game after his idol, Andrés Iniesta. His older brother Seth is also a footballer, currently playing in Austria with Admira Wacker

Career statistics

Honours 
Genk
Belgian First Division A: 2018–19
Belgian Super Cup: 2019

References

External links
 

1998 births
Footballers from Accra
Living people
Ghanaian footballers
Ghana international footballers
Association football midfielders
Tema Youth players
Ferencvárosi TC footballers
K.R.C. Genk players
MKE Ankaragücü footballers
Ghana Premier League players
Nemzeti Bajnokság I players
Belgian Pro League players
Süper Lig players
Ghanaian expatriate footballers
Expatriate footballers in Hungary
Ghanaian expatriate sportspeople in Hungary
Expatriate footballers in Belgium
Ghanaian expatriate sportspeople in Belgium
Expatriate footballers in Turkey
Ghanaian expatriate sportspeople in Turkey
2021 Africa Cup of Nations players